Two ships of the Royal Canadian Navy have been named HMCS Louisburg :
  (I) was a  that served in the Battle of the Atlantic before being sunk in 1943.
  (II) was a modified Flower-class corvette that served in the Battle of the Atlantic from 1943 to 1945.

Battle honours 
 Atlantic 1941–42, 1944–45
 Normandy 1944
 English Channel 1944

References

 Government of Canada Ships' Histories - HMCS Louisbourg

Set index articles on ships
Royal Canadian Navy ship names